Jacob Tomlin (1793 — 1880) was a Protestant Christian missionary who served with the London Missionary Society during the late Qing Dynasty in China. Tomlin and Karl Gutzlaff were the first Protestant missionaries to reside in Thailand, arriving in 1828.

Works authored or edited

 Improved Renderings and Explanations of Many Important and Difficult Passages in the Authorised Translation of the Scriptures (1865)
 Missionary Journals and Letters (1844)

References

Notes

Protestant missionaries in China
Protestant missionaries in Thailand
Protestant writers
English Protestant missionaries
British expatriates in China
British expatriates in Thailand
1793 births
1880 deaths